Sad Hill Cemetery is a tourism site and former film location designed by Carlo Simi in 1966, and built by the Spanish Army.

Significance
It was where the last sequence of the film The Good, the Bad and the Ugly (1966) was filmed. The cemetery was rebuilt in 2015. The reconstruction was recorded in the documentary Sad Hill Unearthed (2017), by Guillermo de Oliveira.

Status
In 2017, the Asociación Cultural Sad Hill (Sad Hill Cultural Association) planned to name Sad Hill Cemetery a Bien de Interés Cultural.

See also
Spaghetti Western
Cinema of Italy

References

External links

 
 

Cemetery art
Cemeteries in Spain
Fiction about cemeteries
1966 establishments in Spain
1960s disestablishments in Spain
Spaghetti Western films
Film and video fandom
Tourist attractions in Burgos
Dollars Trilogy